The Librarian: Quest for the Spear is a 2004 American made-for-television fantasy-adventure film and the first in the Librarian franchise of movies. It was originally released on American cable channel TNT on December 5, 2004, written by David Titcher, directed by Peter Winther and starring Noah Wyle.

Plot
Flynn Carsen (Noah Wyle), a perpetual college student in his 30s with 22 academic degrees, is kicked out of college by his professor, Harris (Mario Iván Martínez), who arranges for Flynn to get his 23rd degree mid-term. They have just completed a 1/20th scale model of the great pyramid, complete with a gold capstone. It will be months before he can sign up for another class. He tells Flynn—who does not know the names of his fellow students— that he lacks real-life experience and needs to see life outside of college. Flynn's mother, Margie (Olympia Dukakis), says the same thing. She is constantly worried about her son and encourages him to get a job, find a wife, and be happy.

Flynn receives a mysterious, magical invitation to interview "for a prestigious position" at the Metropolitan Public Library. Shortly after his odd but successful interview with humorless library administrator, Charlene (Jane Curtin)—and one vital question from a disembodied voice—he is shown the true Library by the owner of the voice, Judson (Bob Newhart). The position of Librarian has existed for thousands of years. His role is to protect historical and often magical items stored in a vast secret space far below the "real" library. The items for which Flynn is responsible include Pandora's Box, Tesla's Death Ray, the Holy Grail, the transmuted corpse of King Midas, the Ark of the Covenant, the Golden Fleece, a live unicorn, the Goose That Laid the Golden Eggs, Excalibur, the original Mona Lisa (in the film the Louvre version is a copy), the original "Little Boy" prototype atomic bomb, a working jet pack, Ali Baba's Flying Carpet, and the Spear of Destiny.

Flynn finds that the job entails more than he expected when one of three parts of the Spear of Destiny is stolen by a cult known as the Serpent Brotherhood, led by the former librarian Wilde (Kyle MacLachlan), who had faked his own death. (The audience learns of Wilde's involvement immediately.) Judson explains that whoever has the complete Spear of Destiny will control the destiny of the entire world (it is said in the film that "Hitler had only one" piece of the Spear). Flynn is the only one on Earth who can track down the remaining two pieces and prevent the Serpent Brotherhood from possessing all three. He heads off to the Amazon jungle, with only two tools: his mind and a book written in a previously untranslated language called the "Language of the birds.”

On the plane, Flynn is ambushed by members of the Serpent Brotherhood and is rescued by a woman who forces him out of the plane in mid-air. Once they land, he finds that his rescuer, Nicole Noone (Sonya Walger), has been sent by Judson. She works for the Library in the role later defined as Guardian. She fell in love with the last Librarian and blames herself for his death. She resists any friendly feelings for Flynn. As the two travel through the Amazon rainforest, they encounter waterfalls, headhunters, bridge collapses, and Maya death traps, which they manage to survive with little difficulty thanks to Flynn's extensive knowledge and Nicole's physical prowess. They retrieve the second piece of the spear and are immediately captured by the brotherhood and Wilde, who is about to shoot Nicole when Flynn steps in front of her. He makes a deal to find the last piece of the spear in exchange for Nicole's life. They head to Shangri-La, in the Himalayas.

At Shangri-La, they learn that their arrival has been prophesied. Flynn retrieves the last spear piece, the blade, and the temple starts to collapse. The monks battle the Serpent Brotherhood and Flynn and Nicole escape in a helicopter, which he flies somewhat erratically, using his book knowledge. They arrive at a hotel, where Nicole orders champagne and asks Flynn if he has read a lot of books about making love. Flynn wakes up the next morning to find Nicole, the spear blade and his clothes missing. Judson contacts him through a TV in the hotel lobby, and when he describes the conditions necessary to join the spear parts together—a golden-cap-stoned pyramid, augmented by a powerful electromagnetic field during a full moon—Flynn realizes that Professor Harris is in on the scheme. He tells Judson to call the Marines, he is coming home.

Judson meets him outside the university building where the pyramid was reconstructed, and when Flynn asks where the Marines are, Judson flashes a tattoo and replies “Semper Fi!”  They watch as the Serpent Brothers, including Harris, assemble to watch Wilde call down the ancient powers and fuse the spear into one. Nicole is their prisoner. After Judson decks a henchman, he says to Flynn, “I was a Librarian, too, you know.” Wilde stabs one of his men, absorbing his life force through the spear, and starts for Nicole. Flynn tackles him and frees Nicole. Nicole and Judson take on the Brotherhood while Flynn follows Wilde, who tries to kill him. When the spear strikes stone the Pyramid shakes. Realizing what is happening, Flynn leads Wilde to damage the support stones, upsetting the precariously balanced structure. The capstone then falls onto Wilde, killing him. Judson and Nicole stand in a room full of unconscious people. Flynn reclaims the spear in the name of the Library, where it is displayed near Excalibur. Flynn draws the sword from its stone. Judson and Charlene show him the latest portrait in the gallery of Librarians: Flynn, holding the Spear. “I hope you saved receipts,” Charlene says. 
 
Three months later, Flynn is at a café talking with his mother about his new job at the public library and his girlfriend, Nicole, who suddenly arrives by motorcycle and kisses Flynn, who introduces her to his Mother. Nicole informs him that the 'Deadly Scorpion League' has got their hands on H. G. Wells' Time Machine (a real time machine, and not the book). As Flynn wonders aloud why so many evil groups have insect names, they take off, pursued by four members of said cult.

Cast
 Noah Wyle as Flynn Carsen
 Sonya Walger as Nicole Noone
 Bob Newhart as Judson
 Jane Curtin as Charlene
 Olympia Dukakis as Margie Carsen
 Kyle MacLachlan as Edward Wilde
 Kelly Hu as Lana
 David Dayan Fisher as Rhodes

Production
In May 2003, it was announced TNT and Dean Devlin's Electric Entertainment would team up to produce action-adventure TV film The Librarian, about a student who is thrown into a world he didn’t expect when he answers a classified ad to be the librarian at the New York Public Library, which turns out to be the repository of mankind’s most secret and valuable artifacts. In May 2004, it was announced Noah Wyle would play the title character.

Reception
On Rotten Tomatoes it has an approval rating of 60% based on reviews from 5 critics.

David Cornelius at eFilmCritic.com gave it a positive review: "It's a fun cheesy cable TV flick, a slice of winking B movie giddiness that charms us into smiling through all the nonsense."

Awards

Nominated for the 2006 Writers Guild Award for Outstanding Achievement in Writing for a Long Form (Original) (David Titcher) by the Writers Guild of America.

DVD

An unrated, Region 1 NTSC DVD was released for this film on August 30, 2005, using an aspect ratio of 1:78:1.

Sequels
A sequel, The Librarian: Return to King Solomon's Mines, aired on TNT on December 3, 2006. It was released on DVD December 19.
The second sequel, The Librarian: Curse of the Judas Chalice, was released on December 7, 2008. A one-hour TV series, The Librarians, premiered on TNT on December 7, 2014, with a ten-episode season. It ran for a total of four seasons.

The character Nicole Noone does not appear in the other films. Her fate is explored in the TV series season 4, where she is portrayed by Rachel Nichols.

References

External links
 
 
 

2004 television films
2004 films
2000s adventure films
Quest for the Spear
Treasure hunt films
Adventure television films